The Dove is a Grade II listed public house at 19 Upper Mall, Hammersmith, London W6 9TA.

History 
It dates from the early 18th century. A number of historical figures have been associated with the pub beside the River Thames. Among these are Graham Greene, Ernest Hemingway, Dylan Thomas and William Morris who lived next door. James Thompson is said to have written the words for the 1740 song Rule, Britannia! there. The pub appears in the 1930 A. P. Herbert novel The Water Gipsies, loosely disguised as the fictitious The Pigeons.

The front bar of the pub is listed in the Guinness Book of Records as the smallest public bar in the United Kingdom. The pub featured in 1963 promotional film Song of London which showed its name sign at the rear that, at the time, wrongly said The Doves.

T. J. Cobden-Sanderson named his Doves Bindery and the Doves Press after the pub.

References

See also

Pubs in the London Borough of Hammersmith and Fulham
Grade II listed buildings in the London Borough of Hammersmith and Fulham
Grade II listed pubs in London
Buildings and structures on the River Thames
Hammersmith
Fuller's pubs